The 1904 Horsham by-election was held on 11 November 1904.  This resulted in the election of the Conservative, Viscount Turnour.

Electoral history

=n/a

Result

Aftermath

References

1904 elections in the United Kingdom
1904 in England
20th century in Sussex
Horsham
By-elections to the Parliament of the United Kingdom in West Sussex constituencies